13th Street station is a SEPTA subway station in Philadelphia, Pennsylvania, located under Market Street between 13th and Juniper Streets in Center City. The station serves the Market–Frankford Line and as the eastern terminal station for all five routes of the subway–surface trolley lines.

13th Street is located on the east side of City Hall and Penn Square and is connected to the Downtown Link concourse, a collection of underground passageways serving multiple stations on the Market–Frankford Line, Broad Street Line, PATCO Speedline, and Regional Rail lines. The station is also served by bus routes operated by SEPTA's City Transit Division and Suburban Division, as well as NJ Transit Bus routes.

The subway–surface platform was known as Juniper Street until 2011. The station is signed as 13th/Juniper Streets on historical system maps.

History 
The station opened August 3, 1908 as part of the first extension of the Philadelphia Rapid Transit Company's Market Street subway. The line had originally opened a year earlier between 69th Street and 15th Street stations.

The Downtown Link and associated underground corridors surrounding the station are expected to undergo a two-year renovation project in conjunction with renovations to the Broad Street Line's City Hall station.

Market–Frankford Line platforms 
The Market–Frankford Line platforms are located one floor below ground level, connected to the Downtown Link concourse. The south concourse, accessible from the eastbound platform, features direct underground access to SEPTA's headquarters and transit museum, located at 1234 Market Street. Market–Frankford trains continue west via Market Street across the Schuylkill River to serve West Philadelphia and Upper Darby, and continue east along Market until Front Street, turning north towards Northeast Philadelphia.

Subway–surface trolley platform 
The subway–surface trolley platform for Routes 10, 11, 13, 34, and 36 is located two stories below ground level, and is accessible only by escalator or stairway from the Market–Frankford platforms. The station is located at the end of the subway–surface line on a balloon loop parallel to Juniper Street, and features a single track with all trolleys operating in the same direction.

Inbound trolleys discharge passengers on the southernmost portion of the platform. The trolleys then proceed to pick up passengers at either Berth 1 or Berth 2. Routes 10, 11 and 13 board at Berth 1, which is located on the northernmost portion of the platform. Routes 34 and 36 board at Berth 2, which is in the center of the platform. Upon departure of the station, the track wraps around and heads west towards 15th Street station. It also features a short spur track to the northeast that was formerly used to park occasional stranded or dead trolleys. The track was recently disconnected from the main line due to unsuccessful attempts to tie it into the trolleys' communications-based train control signaling system.

Station layout 

The stations has two high-level side platforms for the Market–Frankford trains and one low-level side platform for subway–surface trolleys. Fare control and Downtown Link concourse access are both on the upper platform level.

Image gallery

References

External links 

 Juniper Street entrance from Google Maps Street View
 13th Street entrance from Google Maps Street View
 12th Street entrance from Google Maps Street View

SEPTA Market-Frankford Line stations
SEPTA Subway–Surface Trolley Line stations
13th Juniper
Railway stations in the United States opened in 1908
Railway stations located underground in Pennsylvania
1908 establishments in Pennsylvania